State Route 277 (SR 277) is a primary state highway in the U.S. state of Virginia.  Known also as Fairfax Pike and Fairfax Street, the state highway runs  from U.S. Route 11 and SR 631 in Stephens City in southern Frederick County east to US 522 and US 340 at Double Tollgate in the southwestern corner of Clarke County.

Route description

SR 277 begins at an intersection with US 11 (Main Street) in the town of Stephens City.  SR 631 (Fairfax Street) continues west from the intersection through the Newtown-Stephensburg Historic District and out of town toward the village of Marlboro.  SR 277 heads east as a two-lane undivided road, leaving the town limits just west of a diamond interchange with Interstate 81.  The state highway passes between residential subdivisions and passes to the north of Sherando High School before entering farmland.  SR 277 follows the height of land between Wrights Run, which feeds Opequon Creek, to the north and Crooked Run, which is impounded to form Lake Frederick and flows south into the Shenandoah River at Front Royal.  SR 277 reaches its eastern terminus immediately to the east of the Frederick–Clarke county line at an intersection with US 522 and US 340.  US 522 heads north as Front Royal Pike toward Winchester, US 340 heads east and then north as Lord Fairfax Highway toward Berryville, and US 522 and US 340 join in a concurrency as Winchester Road south toward Front Royal.

Future

Major intersections

References

External links

Virginia Highways Project: VA 277

Stephens City, Virginia
277
State Route 277
State Route 277
Transportation in Stephens City, Virginia